Bythiospeum bourguignati is a species of very small freshwater snail that have an operculum, aquatic gastropod mollusks in the family Hydrobiidae.

This species is endemic to France.

References

External links

Hydrobiidae
Bythiospeum
Endemic molluscs of Metropolitan France
Gastropods described in 1866
Taxonomy articles created by Polbot